Varameh (also Romanized as Varāmeh; also known as Warma) is a village in Kharqan District, Saveh County, Markazi Province, Iran. At the 2016 census, its population was 200, in 82 families.

References 

Populated places in Zarandieh County